Loraine is a village in Adams County, Illinois, United States. The population was 300 at the 2020 census.

Geography
Loraine is located at  (40.152039, -91.223732).

History
Loraine was platted in 1870 as a town on the Carthage Branch of the Chicago, Burlington and Quincy Railroad.

Demographics

As of the 2020 census there were 300 people, 175 households, and 107 families residing in the village. The racial makeup of the village was 92.67% White, 0.33% African American, 0.33% from other races, and 6.33% from two or more races. Hispanic or Latino of any race were 1.67% of the population.

There were 175 households, out of which 44.00% had children under the age of 18 living with them, 52.00% were married couples living together, 4.57% had a female householder with no husband present, and 38.86% were non-families. 27.43% of all households were made up of individuals, and 14.86% had someone living alone who was 65 years of age or older. The average household size was 2.95 and the average family size was 2.35.

The village's age distribution consisted of 20.6% under the age of 18, 3.9% from 18 to 24, 25% from 25 to 44, 21.4% from 45 to 64, and 29.1% who were 65 years of age or older. The median age was 45.7 years. For every 100 females, there were 98.1 males. For every 100 females age 18 and over, there were 92.4 males.

The median income for a household in the village was $49,258, and the median income for a family was $53,125. Males had a median income of $40,441 versus $31,250 for females. The per capita income for the village was $22,935. About 2.8% of families and 11.7% of the population were below the poverty line, including 14.1% of those under age 18 and 3.3% of those age 65 or over.

References

Villages in Adams County, Illinois
Quincy, Illinois micropolitan area
Villages in Illinois
1870 establishments in Illinois